Judge O'Connor may refer to:

Earl Eugene O'Connor (1922–1998), judge of the United States District Court for the District of Kansas
James Francis Thaddeus O'Connor (1886–1949), judge of the United States District Court for the Southern District of California
Reed O'Connor (born 1965), judge of the United States District Court for the Northern District of Texas
Robert J. O'Conor Jr. (born 1934), judge of the United States District Court for the Southern District of Texas

See also
Justice O'Connor (disambiguation)